Arf-GAP with GTPase, ANK repeat and PH domain-containing protein 1 is an enzyme that in humans is encoded by the AGAP1 gene.

Function 

CENTG2 belongs to an ADP-ribosylation factor GTPase-activating (ARF-GAP) protein family involved in membrane traffic and actin cytoskeleton dynamics (Nie et al., 2002).[supplied by OMIM]

HACNS1 

HACNS1 is located in an intron of the gene CENTG2 (also known as Human Accelerated Region 2).  HACNS1 is hypothesized to be a gene enhancer "that may have contributed to the evolution of the uniquely opposable human thumb, and possibly also modifications in the ankle or foot that allow humans to walk on two legs". Evidence to date shows that of the 110,000 gene enhancer sequences identified in the human genome, HACNS1 has undergone the most change during the evolution of humans following the split with the ancestors of chimpanzees.

Model organisms
Model organisms have been used in the study of AGAP1 function. A conditional knockout mouse line called Agap1tm1a(EUCOMM)Wtsi was generated at the Wellcome Trust Sanger Institute. Male and female animals underwent a standardized phenotypic screen to determine the effects of deletion. Additional screens performed:  - In-depth immunological phenotyping - in-depth bone and cartilage phenotyping

References

External links

Further reading